Bradley Mousley (born 3 January 1996) is an Australian tennis player. Mousley won the Australian Open boys' doubles title in both 2013 and 2014.

Tennis career

Juniors
As a junior, Mousley reached a career-high ITF Junior combined ranking of world No. 14, which is achieved on March 3, 2014. Partnering compatriot Jay Andrijic, he won the 2013 Australian Open boys' doubles tournament as a 17 year old. He successfully defended the title, winning the boys' doubles championship for the second consecutive year at the 2014 Australian Open, this time alongside partner Lucas Miedler of Austria.

2014
In August 2014, Mousley received a one-year ban, backdated to 30 May 2014, after testing positive for ecstasy in March. Mousley had admitted he had taken the drug at a party in March, and was originally given a two-year ban, but since the drug was not taken with the intent to enhance his performance, the ban was dropped to 12 months.

2017: Australian Open quarterfinal in doubles 
At the 2017 Australian Open, Mousley and partner Alex Bolt were granted a wildcard entry into the men's doubles main draw. Unexpectedly, they won three consecutive matches to reach the quarterfinals of the Grand Slam tournament, before being defeated by Spanish duo Pablo Carreno Busta and Guillermo Garcia Lopez in three sets.

2019
While competing in M15 World Tennis Tour tournament in Hua Hin Thailand, he unfortunately injured his knee badly enough to have to withdraw from his singles semi-final match earlier in the day, and struggled to move freely from the start of his doubles finals match.  He and partner Ajeet Rai were well-beaten by the top-seeded Ratiwatana twins in just 40 minutes.

Mousley has won 2 singles titles and 18 doubles titles on the ATP Challenger and ITF Futures Tours.

ATP Challenger and ITF Futures finals

Singles: 8 (2–6)

Doubles: 32 (18–14)

Junior Grand Slam finals

Doubles: 2 (2 titles)

References

External links
 
 
 

1996 births
Living people
Australian male tennis players
Tennis players from Adelaide
Australian Open (tennis) junior champions
Doping cases in tennis
Australian sportspeople in doping cases
Grand Slam (tennis) champions in boys' doubles
21st-century Australian people